Kilnhurst Colliery F.C. was an English association football club based in Kilnhurst, South Yorkshire.

History

League and cup history

Records
Best FA Cup performance: Preliminary Round

References

Defunct football clubs in England
Defunct football clubs in South Yorkshire
Sheffield & District Football League
Sheffield & Hallamshire County Senior Football League
Doncaster & District Senior League
Sheffield Association League
Mining association football teams in England